Mount Chester is a mountain located in the Smith-Dorrien Creek Valley of Kananaskis in the Canadian Rockies. The mountain was named in 1917 after HMS Chester, which was severely damaged in the Battle of Jutland.

Chester Lake is located in a small valley just northwest of the base of the mountain.

Geology

Mount Chester is composed of sedimentary rock laid down during the Precambrian to Jurassic periods. Formed in shallow seas, this sedimentary rock was pushed east and over the top of younger rock during the Laramide orogeny.

Climate

Based on the Köppen climate classification, Mount Chester is located in a subarctic climate with cold, snowy winters, and mild summers.

References

External links
Chester on Fresh-Oxygen - route beta, photos

Three-thousanders of Alberta
Kananaskis Improvement District
Alberta's Rockies